Robert Gates Jr. (born December 31, 1985) is an American professional golfer.

Early life and education
Gates was born and raised in Gainesville, Florida. He attended F. W. Buchholz High School, and in his senior year, he led its golf team in scoring average. Gates was named Scholar Athlete of the Year for Alachua County, Florida. 

Gates attended Texas A&M University, graduating in 2008 with a degree in agriculture.

Career
Gates turned professional after graduation and played on the Gateway Tour in 2008. He also played on the Canadian Tour in 2009, finishing 22nd on the Order of Merit.

Gates joined the Nationwide Tour in 2010 after finishing T-42 at the 2009 PGA Tour qualifying school. He won in his debut event on Tour, the 2010 Michael Hill New Zealand Open. He finished the year 16th on the money list and earned his 2011 PGA Tour card. He missed retaining his tour card by one spot and $1,431; D. J. Trahan got the 125th and final PGA Tour card for 2012. Gates later regained his Tour Card through Q School. Gates finished outside the top 125 (141st) on the money list in 2012 and earned his 2013 PGA Tour card through Q School. He made only four cuts in 20 events. He played in the Web.com Tour Finals and finished 35th to earn his PGA Tour card for 2014. In 2013–14, he played in only 14 events due to injury, making one cut. He has not played in a PGA Tour event since the 2014 Travelers Championship and has a five-event medical extension available upon his return.

Professional wins (2)

PGA Tour of Australasia wins (1)

1Co-sanctioned by the Nationwide Tour

Nationwide Tour wins (1)

1Co-sanctioned by the PGA Tour of Australasia

Other wins (1)
2008 DFW Spring #4 (Gateway Tour)

Results in major championships

CUT = missed the half-way cut
"T" = tied for place

Results in World Golf Championships

WD = withdrew

See also
2010 Nationwide Tour graduates
2011 PGA Tour Qualifying School graduates
2012 PGA Tour Qualifying School graduates
2013 Web.com Tour Finals graduates

References

External links

American male golfers
Texas A&M Aggies men's golfers
PGA Tour golfers
Korn Ferry Tour graduates
Golfers from Texas
Golfers from Florida
Sportspeople from Gainesville, Florida
Sportspeople from Harris County, Texas
People from The Woodlands, Texas
1985 births
Living people